Felidae is the family of mammals in the order Carnivora colloquially referred to as cats. A member of this family is also called a felid. The term "cat" refers both to felids in general and specifically to the domestic cat (Felis catus).

The 41 Felidae species exhibit the most diverse fur pattern of all terrestrial carnivores. Cats have retractile claws, slender muscular bodies and strong flexible forelimbs. Their teeth and facial muscles allow for a powerful bite. They are all obligate carnivores, and most are solitary predators ambushing or stalking their prey. Wild cats occur in Africa, Europe, Asia and the Americas. Some wild cat species are adapted to forest habitats, some to arid environments, and a few also to wetlands and mountainous terrain. Their activity patterns range from nocturnal and crepuscular to diurnal, depending on their preferred prey species.

Reginald Innes Pocock divided the extant Felidae into three subfamilies: the Pantherinae, the Felinae and the Acinonychinae, differing from each other by the ossification of the hyoid apparatus and by the cutaneous sheaths which protect their claws.
This concept has been revised following developments in molecular biology and techniques for analysis of morphological data. Today, the living Felidae are divided in two subfamilies: the Pantherinae and Felinae, with the Acinonychinae subsumed into the latter. Pantherinae includes five Panthera and two Neofelis species, while Felinae includes the other 34 species in ten genera.

The latter species complex was ancestral to two main lines of felids: the cats in the extant subfamilies and a group of extinct cats of the subfamily Machairodontinae, which include the saber-toothed cats such as the Smilodon. The "false sabre-toothed cats", the Barbourofelidae and Nimravidae, are not true cats, but are closely related. Together with the Felidae, Viverridae, hyenas and mongooses, they constitute the Feliformia.

Characteristics

All members of the cat family have the following characteristics in common:
 They are digitigrade, have five toes on their forefeet and four on their hind feet. Their curved claws are protractile and attached to the terminal bones of the toe with ligaments and tendons. The claws are guarded by cutaneous sheaths, except in the Acinonyx.
 The plantar pads of both fore and hind feet form compact three-lobed cushions.
 They actively protract the claws by contracting muscles in the toe, and they passively retract them. The dewclaws are expanded but do not protract.
 They have lithe and flexible bodies with muscular limbs.
 Their skull is foreshortened with a rounded profile and large orbits.
The upper third premolar and lower molar are adapted as carnassial teeth, suited to tearing and cutting flesh. The canine teeth are large, reaching exceptional size in the extinct saber-toothed species. The lower carnassial is smaller than the upper carnassial and has a crown with two compressed blade-like pointed cusps.
 Their tongue is covered with horny papillae, which rasp meat from prey and aid in grooming.
 Their nose projects slightly beyond the lower jaw.
 Their eyes are relatively large, situated to provide binocular vision. Their night vision is especially good due to the presence of a tapetum lucidum, which reflects light back inside the eyeball, and gives felid eyes their distinctive shine. As a result, the eyes of felids are about six times more light-sensitive than those of humans, and many species are at least partially nocturnal. The retina of felids also contains a relatively high proportion of rod cells, adapted for distinguishing moving objects in conditions of dim light, which are complemented by the presence of cone cells for sensing colour during the day.
 They have well-developed and highly sensitive whiskers above the eyes, on the cheeks, on the muzzle, but not below the chin. Whiskers help to navigate in the dark and to capture and hold prey.
 Their external ears are large and especially sensitive to high-frequency sounds in the smaller cat species. This sensitivity allows them to locate small rodent prey.
 The penis is subconical, facing backward when not erect. The baculum is small or vestigial, and shorter than in the Canidae.
 Felids have a vomeronasal organ in the roof of the mouth, allowing them to "taste" the air. The use of this organ is associated with the Flehmen response.
 They cannot detect the sweetness of sugar, as they lack the sweet-taste receptor.
 They share a broadly similar set of vocalisations, but with some variation between species. In particular, the pitch of calls varies, with larger species producing deeper sounds; overall, the frequency of felid calls ranges between 50 and 10,000 hertz. The standard sounds made by all felids include meowing, spitting, hissing, snarling and growling. Meowing is the main contact sound, whereas the others signify an aggressive motivation.
 They can purr during both phases of respiration, though pantherine cats seem to purr only during oestrus and copulation, and as cubs when suckling. Purring is generally a low pitch sound of less than 2 kHz and mixed with other vocalization types during the expiratory phase. The ability to roar comes from an elongated and specially adapted larynx and hyoid apparatus. When air passes through the larynx on the way from the lungs, the cartilage walls of the larynx vibrate, producing sound. Only lions, leopards, tigers, and jaguars are truly able to roar, although the loudest mews of snow leopards have a similar, if less structured, sound.
The colour, length and density of their fur is very diverse. Fur colour covers the gamut from white to black, and fur pattern from distinctive small spots, stripes to small blotches and rosettes. Most cat species are born with a spotted fur, except the jaguarundi (Herpailurus yagouaroundi), Asian golden cat (Catopuma temminckii) and caracal (Caracal caracal). The spotted fur of lion (Panthera leo) and cougar (Puma concolor) cubs change to a uniform fur during their ontogeny. Those living in cold environments have thick fur with long hair, like the snow leopard (Panthera uncia) and the Pallas's cat (Otocolobus manul). Those living in tropical and hot climate zones have short fur. Several species exhibit melanism with all-black individuals.

In the great majority of cat species, the tail is between a third and a half of the body length, although with some exceptions, like the Lynx species and margay (Leopardus wiedii). Cat species vary greatly in body and skull sizes, and weights:
 The smallest cat species are the rusty-spotted cat (Prionailurus rubiginosus) and the black-footed cat (Felis nigripes).

Most cat species have a haploid number of 18 or 19. Central and South American cats have a haploid number of 18, possibly due to the combination of two smaller chromosomes into a larger one.

Most cat species are also induced ovulators, although the margay appears to be a spontaneous ovulator.

Felidae have type IIx muscle fibers three times more powerful than the muscle fibers of human athletes.

Evolution

The family Felidae is part of the Feliformia, a suborder that diverged probably about  into several families.

This is about 20million years later than the Ursidae and the Nimravidae, and about 10 million years later than the Canidae.

Its fossil jaws were also excavated in geological formations of Europe's Vallesian, Asia's Middle Miocene and North America's late Hemingfordian to late Barstovian epochs.

In the Early or Middle Miocene, the sabre-toothed Machairodontinae evolved in Africa and migrated northwards in the Late Miocene. With their large upper canines, they were adapted to prey on large-bodied megaherbivores. Miomachairodus is the oldest known member of this subfamily. Several Paramachaerodus skeletons were found in Spain. This subfamily became extinct in the Late Pleistocene.

Results of mitochondrial analysis indicate that the living Felidae species descended from a common ancestor, which originated in Asia in the Late Miocene epoch. They migrated to Africa, Europe and the Americas in the course of at least 10 migration waves during the past ~11 million years. Low sea levels, interglacial and glacial periods facilitated these migrations. A fossil skull was excavated in 2010 in Zanda County on the Tibetan Plateau. Panthera palaeosinensis from North China probably dates to the Late Miocene or Early Pliocene. The skull of the holotype is similar to that of a lion or leopard. Several fossil skulls and jawbones were excavated in northwestern China.

Living felids fall into eight evolutionary lineages or species clades. Genotyping of nuclear DNA of all 41 felid species revealed that hybridization between species occurred in the course of evolution within the majority of the eight lineages.

Modelling of felid coat pattern transformations revealed that nearly all patterns evolved from small spots.

Classification
Traditionally, five subfamilies had been distinguished within the Felidae based on phenotypical features: the Pantherinae, the Felinae, the Acinonychinae, and the extinct Machairodontinae and Proailurinae. Acinonychinae used to only contain the genus Acinonyx but this genus is now within the Felinae subfamily.

Phylogeny
The following cladogram based on Piras et al. (2013) depicts the phylogeny of basal living and extinct groups.

The phylogenetic relationships of living felids are shown in the following cladogram:

See also
 Cat gap
 Felid hybrid
 List of felids
 List of largest cats
 Nimravidae

References

External links

 
 

Mammal families
Extant Chattian first appearances
Taxa named by Gotthelf Fischer von Waldheim